Floyd D. Hall (April 4, 1916 – April 26, 2012) was an American businessman and pilot who served as chairman and chief executive of Eastern Airlines from 1964 to 1976 between the tenures of Eddie Rickenbacker and Frank Borman.

Hall was born in Lamar, Colorado, the son of a hotel owner. He graduated from the University of Colorado in 1936, served in the United States Army Air Corps for two years, then joined TWA as a pilot. Upon the outbreak of World War II, he returned to the Army Air Corps, where he rose to the rank of lieutenant colonel. In 1946, he returned to TWA, where he worked as a pilot for ten years, then in management. In 1964, he was hired by Eastern Airlines as chief executive.

He died in Woodstock, Vermont.

References

1916 births
2012 deaths
American airline chief executives
University of Colorado alumni
People from Lamar, Colorado
United States Army Air Forces personnel of World War II